Gaye Kruger (born Gaye Rescher on April 17, 1951), also known as Gaye Rescher Ribble and Gaye Kruger Ribble, is a former American actress and voice actress. She is the sister of actress Dee Dee Rescher.

After playing small roles in various stage, television and film productions (including Mr. Mom, Eight is Enough and The Scarlett O'Hara War), she gained recognition for her voice performance as Makie in the Streamline Pictures English dub of Yoshiaki Kawajiri's OVA film Wicked City, released in 1993 in North America. Wicked City is her only known role as a voice actress.

Kruger has effectively retired from acting, and now works with her husband, David Ribble, and his company StandOut Marketing Strategies, providing business and marketing strategies to clients.

Selected filmography

Eight is Enough - Stephanie
Illusions by Julie Dash - Leila Grant 
Mr. Mom - Secretary
Queen of the Stardust Ballroom - Young Woman
The Scarlett O'Hara War - Lorraine
Venice/Venice - Interviewee
Wicked City (1993 Streamline dub) - Makie

References

External links
 
 
 

1951 births
American voice actresses
Living people
Actresses from Los Angeles
Greenwich High School alumni
21st-century American women